Gijsbert (Bert) Bos (born 1963) is a computer scientist known for the development of Argo, a web browser he developed as test application for his style sheet proposal.

Life and work 
Born in The Hague, Bos studied mathematics at the University of Groningen, and wrote his PhD thesis on Rapid user interface development with the script language Gist.

In 1996, he joined the World Wide Web Consortium (W3C) to work on Cascading Style Sheets (CSS). He is a former chairman and the current W3C Staff Contact of the CSS Working Group. He is based in Sophia Antipolis, France.

Selected publications 
Bos has, along with Håkon Wium Lie, written a book about Cascading Style Sheets.

 Cascading Style Sheets: Designing for the Web, 
 Cascading Style Sheets: Designing for the Web (2nd Edition), 
Cascading Style Sheets: Designing for the Web (3rd Edition),

References

External links 
Homepage at W3C

1963 births
Living people
Scientists from The Hague
Dutch computer programmers
Dutch computer scientists
University of Groningen alumni